A border incident is an event at a border.

Border Incident may also refer to:
 Border Incident, a 1949 American film
 Border Incident (horse), a racehorse

See also 
 List of border conflicts